Desislava Vandova Bogusheva (born 3 March 1980) is a Bulgarian gymnastics coach and choreographer, Fédération Internationale de Gymnastique (FIG) breve judge and expert breve holder. She is known as the founder of the Aerobic Gymnastics in Thailand.

Coaching career
The 12 years under Bogusheva's leadership was a very successful period in Thai gymnastics. She was responsible for the successes of two generations of Thai gymnasts. At Asian and World cup championships, Bogusheva's gymnasts won 45 medals, becoming winners at the South-East Asian Games, twice.

FIG Expert Career

In December 2012 Bogusheva completed FIG Level 3 Coaching Academy, achieving expert Breve. In July 2018 she started her career as a lecturer and coaching academy leader. 
List of assignments:
 AGU AER common training camp in Almaty, Kazakhsan, 
 FIG Academy Level 1 in Baku, Azerbaijan.
 FIG AER Age Group development camp in Harare, Zimbabwe
 FIG AER Age Group development camp in Brits, RSA
 FIG AER Age Group development camp in Hanoi, VIE.
 FIG Academy Level 3 in Hai Phong, Vietnam

Achievements
 Bogusheva coached and led the Thailand Natioanal team on three South-Asian Games, three Asian Indoor Games, multiple World Cup championships and six World Championships 2006–2016
 23rd Southeast Asian Games, Manila (Philippines) 2005, Thailand Aerobic Gymnastics National team won all four gold medals in four categories.
 24th Southeast Asian Games, Korat (Thailand) 2007, Thailand Aerobic Gymnastics National team won once again four gold medals in four categories.
 11th Aerobic gymnastic World championship Rodez (France) 201, her student Roypim Ngampeerapong qualified for the finals in Individual Woman category. She became the first gymnast in the history of Thailand to qualify for the World Championship's finals, which was awarded by the International Gymnastics Federation FIG with the title "World class gymnast"
 9th World Games Cali 2013 (Colombia), Roypim Ngampeerapong and Nattawut Pimpa marked the first ever participation of Thai gymnasts at the World Games. The qualification for the Games is based on the top 8 athletes ranked from the previous World Championship.
 13th Aerobic gymnastic World championship Cancun (MEX) 2014 - Roypim Ngmapeerapong scored the best ever result in the history of Thailand by ranking 5th in the Individual Woman category.

Notable students
Since Bogusheva's appointment as head coach of Thailand's Aerobic Gymnastics, Thailand has had an international success. Notable students include:
 Roypim Ngampeerapong (born in 1989) - recognised by FIG as a World Class Gymnast, multiple World Cup medalist, participated in 5 World Championship 2006 - 2014
 First ever Thai gymnast qualified for the World Championship's Finals - Rodez 2010
 Ranked 5th in the individual women category at the 13th Aerobic Gymnastics World Championship Cancun (Mexico) 2014, highest finish ever for Thailand 
 Nattawut Pimpa (born in 1986) - 2005 and 2007 Sea Games gold medalist, multiple World Cup medalist, participated at six world championships
 Became famous as the first Thai gymnast to have an element named after him in the aerobic gymnastics code of points, awarded by FIG with the highest possible score of 1.0 point per single skill

FIG TC
On November 6, 2021, at the 83rd FIG Congress in Antalya, Turkey, Desislava Bogusheva was elected as Aerobic Gymnastics Technical Committee Member. The Congress ratified the decision of the FIG Executive Committee to reduce the next terms of office for all positions to three years instead of four, in order to correspond with the Olympic cycle leading up to the Paris 2024 Olympic Games.

References

External links
Bogusheva

Bulgarian gymnasts
Living people
1980 births